The Pukguksong-1 or Pukkŭksŏng-1, Bukgeukseong-1 (Hangul: 북극성1호, Hanja: 北極星1号, literally Polaris-1), alternatively KN-11 in intelligence communities outside North Korea, is a North Korean, two-stage submarine-launched ballistic missile (SLBM) that was successfully flight tested on 24 August 2016.

Pukguksong-1 is officially recognized by North Korea, South Korea and the United States as a missile that went through a complete, successful test on 24 August 2016.  North Korea has never announced the actual operational range and payload, as this technical information is probably considered classified. Most countries do this: e.g., the United States considers the exact operational range of its current SLBM, UGM-133 Trident II, as classified information as well.

Design 
In 2015, the missile was first launched with a liquid fuel motor, which was later replaced by a solid fuel motor. The earlier launches, conducted from a barge, did not feature grid fins, while the later submarine launched missiles did. The difference between the Pukguksong-1 and the Pukguksong-3 are the missile diameter, with the -1 being about 1.1 m in diameter, while the -3 is about 1.4 m, like the Pukguksong-2, as older model Pukguksong-3 also exist, with a similar pointed nose cone.

Modified variant 
On 20 October 2021, North Korea launched a different version of the Pukguksong-1, with a lengthened body and modified cable raceway. It first appeared in the 12 October 'Self-defence 2021' exhibition, where it was shown next to an older model Pukguksong-3. The new missile features improved control, such as 'flank mobility and gliding skip mobility' and is started with a gas dynamic piston. The missile has been also claimed to be a modified KN-23, and the Japanese government still maintains that two missiles were fired despite North Korean state media stating only one was fired.

Solid fuel motor in other missiles 

The KN-23, which is usually reported as an Iskander clone likely uses a Pukguksong-1 solid fuel motor with a different nozzle. Compared to the Iskander, the KN-23 is noticeably wider and larger; it likely has the same 1.1 metre diameter as the Pukguksong-1 and thus shares the engine. Similarly, while the KN-24 is similar to the MGM-140 ATACMS, it is much larger than it with a 1.1 metre diameter; it is thus likely to be similar to the Pukuksong-1, but having only one stage.

The motors, at around 1.1 m in diameter, used in these missiles likely derive from the solid fuel motors of the Soviet RT-15, possibly originally acquired for scrap. The casing is made of an unknown metal and the nozzle is likely made from carbon fibre composites, which have been displayed on television.

List of tests

As of 2019, there have been no further flight tests.

Strategic implications
The Pukguksong-1 is the first sign of a North Korean sea-based nuclear deterrent, which complicates the U.S. and South Korean ability to preemptively destroy the country's nuclear capabilities by threatening a second strike. While there is a chance to take out land-based nuclear sites, ballistic missile submarines ensure that a retaliatory strike could still be launched before it can be found and neutralized.

North Korea's unique circumstances limit the ways such a capability could be employed. It is thought that the country needs more time to develop submarines for reliably deploying weapons like the Pukguksong-1 missile.

Given their submarines' insufficient power to outrun U.S. Navy nuclear attack submarines and lack of aerial and surface coverage to protect them out to long distances, they cannot venture far out to sea, although a scenario where a missile-equipped sub travels into the Sea of Japan (East Sea of Korea) on a "suicide mission" to fire the Pukguksong-1 before it expects to inevitably get destroyed is not implausible given the loyalty of the elite crewmen of the submarine force.

A more likely scenario would be deployment along the Korean coastline within North Korean local air and surface cover and silent movement into or out of various hiding spots like bays, inlets, and outer isles before achievement of a pre-designated position, with quiet submerged operation on battery power; because of its finite power capacity, the sub would have to surface or snorkel for air to recharge its batteries if it remains hiding for an extended period, making it vulnerable to anti-submarine warfare (ASW) efforts.

A land based, mobile derivative of the Pukguksong-1 would significantly complicate U.S, Japan and South Korean defenses. Unlike the liquid fueled Rodong or SCUD derivatives, the solid fueled Pukguksong-1 can be fired at a much shorter notification time. The North Korean have since achieved this Pukguksong-2 land-based, mobile derivative of the Pukguksong-1 milestone in their 12th test of the missile on 12 February 2017.

First completely successful test
On 24 August 2016 at around 5:30 am (Pyongyang Standard Time), North Korea successfully tested the Pukguksong-1 as the missile flew 500 km into Japan's ADIZ without issue. Unlike the recent successful Musudan flight,  KCNA did not officially announce the test until a day later, calling it a great success on the part of Kim Jong Un. The entire development has since been published worldwide.

In light of recent development of the Pukguksong-1, South Korean military sources concluded that the first successful Pukguksong-1 test was in fact launched in lofted trajectory. This is without confirmation of the actual apogee, and therefore the range could have been at least 1,000 km or more had the missile launched in normal trajectory and could be operationally deployed as early as 2017. Hawkish forces in South Korea have renewed calls for South Korea to construct nuclear submarines to counter North Korea's 'provocation'.

However, the US-Korea Institute at Johns Hopkins University rejected South Korean claims that the Pukguksong-1 could be operationally deployed before 2017, suggesting its initial operational capability will not be achieved before June 2018. Specifically, North Korea still faces significant technological challenges, including building a new class of submarine to carry 3 such missiles at once.

On 30 August 2016, David Wright, a missile expert and co-director of the Union of Concerned Scientists' Global Security Program, suggested that the apogee achieved by this test was 550 km and the range would have been 1,250 km, assuming the same payload on standard trajectory.

On the same day, the South Korean media reported that Jeffrey Lewis, director of the East Asia Nonproliferation Program at the James Martin Center for Nonproliferation Studies (CNS), since recommends that South Korea deploy 2 batteries of THAAD instead of 1 in order to counter the possibility of North Korea's firing a Pukguksong-1 outside its 120-degree field of vision.

However, Lewis also stressed that it does little to address the possibility of lofted attack, because the missile's reentry in lofted trajectory will be at very high speeds and at a very steep angle, the ability of THAAD interception depending on the missile range. He also noted that THAAD was never field tested against an intermediate-range target or on an unusual angle of attack. With this in mind, he ended by suggesting it is time to use diplomatic measures for dissuading North Korea from enhancing such capabilities and defense measures. This is a very ineffective strategy, since North Korea has the ability to use numerous counter-measures for every measures the US and South Korea have.

Suspected Chinese involvement in the proliferation of SLBM technologies of North Korea
On 3 September 2016, US expert Bruce Bechtol, a North Korea expert at Angelo State University, and another South Korean national security researcher, Shin Jong-woo, claimed that China must have provided North Korea with the relevant SLBM technologies, since it took a mere 4 months from the first successful cold launch Test (23 April 2016) to the first complete test (24 August 2016) and further claimed that the Pukguksong-1 is a carbon-copy of first China's first SLBM, JL-1. In comparison, China took 15 years to develop JL-1. Bruce Bechtol also stated his analysis is supported by space program expert Tal Inbar of Israel's Fisher Institute. However, Dave Schmerler of the James Martin Center of Non Proliferation Studies noted that the North Korean missile used a single engine design (the JL-1 used 4 engines) and grid fins for flight stability, features not found on the Chinese JL-1, and urged caution in jumping to conclusions. He added that the single-engine design had more in common with the Iranian Sejjil MRBM than the JL-1.

Response from China to alleged proliferation activities
On 5 September 2016, the Chinese media refuted the report by citing that the People's Republic of China as a Nuclear Non-Proliferation Treaty signatory state and stating that one of the permanent members of United Nations Security Council would never proliferate by providing or selling nuclear and missile-related technologies to North Korea (The actual excerpts are as follows: 作为联合国安理会常任理事国、《核不扩散条约》缔约国，中国绝对不会向朝鲜提供或者出售与核武器和弹道导弹相关的装备和技术。.

This report also states that some US experts and think-tanks have all along been irresponsible in making defamatory statements about China, as they unreasonably link North Korea's nuclear capability to China and have sought to use media influence to pressure China. This report does not contain actual evidence of supposed proliferation on China's part. (The actual excerpts read as follows: 一些美国媒体和智库一向很擅长将朝鲜的涉核问题与中国进行无端挂钩，就是希望通过这种方式向中国施压，而这些说法通常没有任何证据，是很不负责任的。)

See also
 R-29 Vysota
 R-29RM Shtil
 R-29RMU Sineva
 R-29RMU2 Layner
 RSM-56 Bulava
 UGM-133 Trident II
 M45 (missile)
 M51 (missile)
 JL-1
 JL-2
 K Missile family
 R-39 Rif
 R-39M

References

External links
CSIS Missile Threat - Pukguksong-1 (KN-11)
Estimating KN-11 range and reliability, applying Bayesian model) 

Submarine-launched ballistic missiles
Ballistic missiles of North Korea
Submarine-launched ballistic missiles of North Korea